The Colt Canada C20 DMR is a 7.62×51mm NATO designated marksman rifle created by Colt Canada, in response to a request by the Canadian Armed Forces to replace their earlier 5.56mm C8 carbine in sniper sections. The weapon is intended to enter service in the Canadian and Danish militaries, beginning in 2021. C20 rifles are fitted with the Schmidt & Bender 3-20×50 Ultra Short riflescope.

Design 
The C20 DMR is a semi-automatic rifle that uses 20-round 7.62×51mm NATO box magazines. A major part of its design philosophy was making sure that it was reliable in extreme conditions, such as those specified in the NATO D/14 standards for safety, in which aspects of the weapon such as the kinematics, safety features, recoil, and barrel strength are put under the most severe strain. During these tests, the C20 fired 8,000 rounds without any stoppages and achieved an accuracy of 0.66 MOA over 144 five round groups. The C20 DMR barrel features 4 groove rifling with a 1:254 mm (1 in 10 in) twist rate. Colt Canada also advertises the weapon's versatility, offering features such as:

 An optional chrome-lined barrel
 Upper receiver integrated with a previous Colt Canada weapon, the Modular Rail Rifle
 MIL-STD-1913 44 or 48 slot top rail with 0 MOA or 20 MOA integral incline
 M-LOK slots in the 3, 6 and 9 o’clock positions
 Double-stage trigger
 Adjustable buttstock

Users 
 : First rifles delivered in November 2020, and to become standard issue in March 2021. A total of 272 rifles, including spare parts, were bought by the Canadian Department of National Defence for 8.5 million CAD (6.35 million USD).
 : Bought for the Danish Armed Forces to replace the Heckler & Koch HK417, the first rifles are set to be delivered in the first quarter of 2021. Designated the Finskyttegevaer, Kort (FINSKGV K). The Danish Defence Acquisition and Logistics Organization publicly confirmed their purchase of the rifles on 23 September 2020.

See also 
 C14 Timberwolf, Canadian bolt-action rifle in service since 2005
 Heckler & Koch PSG1
M110 Semi-Automatic Sniper System
 List of semi-automatic rifles
 List of equipment of the Canadian Army

References 

7.62×51mm NATO semi-automatic rifles
Semi-automatic rifles
Designated marksman rifles
Rifles of Canada
Colt rifles
ArmaLite AR-10 derivatives
Weapons and ammunition introduced in 2019
Sniper rifles of Canada